Michael Cram (born July 11, 1968) is a Canadian actor and singer-songwriter.

Early life
He grew up in Ottawa, Ontario, and attended Hillcrest High School before studying economics at Carleton University. He then studied theatre at The Center For Actor Study in Toronto. He has also lived and worked in Toronto as well as Vancouver and Los Angeles. Cram lives with his wife, an information architect, in Los Angeles. Michael Cram has a younger brother, Bruce, who is a real-estate agent and lives in Toronto with his wife and two kids.

Career

Music career 
Cram has been a member of Redchair, Amsterdam and Cold House. On November 6, 2011, he played a gig with his former Flashpoint co-star Amy Jo Johnson at the Free Times Cafe in Toronto.

Acting career 
He is best known for his role as Kevin "Wordy" Wordsworth in the hit television series Flashpoint and Tim in the drama-comedy-horror film He Never Died.

Filmography

Film

Television

Notes

External links
 
 Michael Cram on Myspace

1968 births
20th-century Canadian male actors
21st-century Canadian male actors
Canadian male film actors
Canadian male singer-songwriters
Canadian male television actors
Canadian male voice actors
Carleton University alumni
Living people
Male actors from Ontario
People from Cornwall, Ontario